John Rhodes may refer to:

Politics and law
 Sir John Rhodes, 2nd Baronet (1884–1955), British businessman and MP
 John Q. Rhodes Jr. (1892–1959), American politician in Virginia
 John Jacob Rhodes (1916–2003), U.S. Representative from Arizona
 John Rhodes (Canadian politician) (1929–1978), Canadian politician in Ontario
 John Jacob Rhodes III (1943–2011), U.S. Representative from Arizona
 John W. Rhodes (fl. 2003–2007), American politician in North Carolina

Sports
 John Rhodes (sailor) (1870–1947), English sailor and Olympic gold medalist
 John Rhodes (coach) (1902–1951), American football and baseball player and coach
 Gordon Rhodes (John Gordon Rhodes, 1907–1960), American baseball player
 John Rhodes (racing driver) (born 1927), British Formula One driver
 John Rhodes (cricketer) (born 1962), English cricketer
 John Rhodes (basketball) (born 1965), American basketball coach and player
 John Rhodes (baseball) (born 2000), American baseball player

Others
 John Rhodes (17th century) (fl. 1624–1665), English theatrical figure
 John Milson Rhodes (1847–1909), English general practitioner and pioneer of social reform
 John Harold Rhodes (1891–1917), English recipient of the Victoria Cross
 John Rhodes (mathematician) (born 1937), American mathematician, co-developer of Krohn–Rhodes theory
 John M. Rhodes, United States National Guard general

See also
 Johnny Rhodes (disambiguation)